Akrotiri Bay (Kolpos Akrotiriou) is a part of the Mediterranean Sea east of the Akrotiri Peninsula on the southern coast of the island of Cyprus. The city of Limassol is also located on the bay. The southern end of the bay is formed by Cape Gata.

Geography of Akrotiri and Dhekelia
Bays of Cyprus
Ports and harbours of British Overseas Territories